Sphingomonadaceae are a gram-negative bacterial family of the Alphaproteobacteria. An important feature is the presence of sphingolipids (mainly 2′-hydroxymyristol dihydrosphingosine 1-glucuronic acid, "SGL-1") in the outer membrane of the cell wall. The cells are ovoid or rod-shaped. Others are also pleomorphic, i.e. the cells change the shape over time. Some species from Sphingomonadaceae family are dominant components of biofilms.

Energy source 
While most species within Sphingomonadaceae family are heterotrophic, some are phototrophic.

Function 
Some species of Sphingomonadaceae are known to degrade some aromatic compounds. This makes the bacteria of interest to environmental remediation.

The diverse metabolic capacity of genera within the Sphingomonadaceae family, such as Sphingobium, Novosphingobium, and Sphingopyxis enable these genera to adapt to and be abundant in the presence of Bisphenol A. A microbial community with abundant Sphingomonadaceae members can degrade Bisphenol A with a constant rate.

Some Sphingomonas species are able to produce sphingans, a kind of exopolysaccharides with certain viscosity. This property of sphingans makes it useful in many industries including food and pharmaceutical.

Distribution 
Bacteria within Sphingomonadaceae family are distributed in various environments, such as water, soil, sediment.

Phylogeny
The currently accepted taxonomy is based on the List of Prokaryotic names with Standing in Nomenclature and the phylogeny is based on whole-genome sequences.

Interaction with human and plants 
Some members of the Sphingomonadaceae commonly exist in human-impacted environments, including drinking water systems, hospital and household tap water, and medical devices.

Most of the species of the Sphingomonadaceae are not known to be harmful to humans or plants. Some species can protect plants from disease-causing pathogens such as Thielaviopsis basicola, and Rhizoctonia solani.

The Sphingomonas and Sphingobium genera tend to have higher antibiotic resistance compared with three other genera within the Sphingomonadaceae: Novosphingobium, Sphingopyxis, and Blastomonas.

Notes

References 

Sphingomonadales
Bacteria families